The 1996 Asian Junior Athletics Championships was the sixth edition of the international athletics competition for Asian under-20 athletes, organised by the Asian Athletics Association. It took place from 3–6 December in New Delhi, India. It was the second time that the Indian capital had hosted the competition, following the 1992 edition. A total of 41 events were contested, 22 for male athletes and 19 for female athletes.

Medal summary

Men

Women

1996 Medal Table

References

Results
Asian Junior Championships 1996. World Junior Athletics History. Retrieved on 2013-10-19.

External links
Asian Athletics official website

Asian Junior Championships
Asian Junior Athletics Championships
International athletics competitions hosted by India
Athletics in New Delhi
Asian Junior Athletics Championships
Asian Junior Athletics Championships
Asian Junior Athletics Championships
Asian Junior Athletics Championships
Sports competitions in Delhi